abas ERP is an enterprise resource planning (ERP) and e-business application for manufacturers such as those using make to order and other related sales models. It was developed by  ABAS Software AG, since 1980 based in Karlsruhe, Germany.

Main product 
The main product of the company is abas ERP, an ERP system for small and medium enterprises.
The functionality includes purchasing and sales, production, materials management and financial accounting. The system is used in mechanical and plant engineering, in the automotive industry and in trade and service companies. The system uses a Unicode character set and is operated in 28 languages.

Architecture 
The software uses a tiered software architecture. The foundation is an object-oriented database. The application tier is based on the database and contains the main functions. The presentation tier, or "Flexible User Interface (FOP)", comprises the third and final tier, which interfaces with the user. The "Individual User Interface", the "Standard Flexible User Interface" and the "abas Tools" belong to the presentation tier.

OS basis 
Linux, other UNIX derivates and Windows are available as server operating systems. Windows or Linux (Wine (software)) is used on the workstations.

Database 
ABAS Business Suite is based on its own object-oriented database. The log structure offers usual database features such as online backup, rollback and copying in running operation. The following APIs are possible for the database access: a Java-based framework (AJO), a simple proprietary 4GL language (FO), APIs in C, C++, C#, VB, VBA as well as the standard interfaces ODBC and SQL.

Individual adjustments 
Individual fields and tables can be added to the standard software on database level. Existing or individual screens can be adjusted and layouts can be designed using a graphical screen editor. On the event level, the business logic and dialog control can be adjusted or configured using event handlers. These can be optionally implemented in FO or Java. These adjustments remain during upgrades if the programming has been clean. Since 2008 Groovy is also being supported. FO programs can be written using the structogram editor EasyCODE, for example. The Java-based implementation is supported by an AJO workbench, which is integrated into the Eclipse development environment.

Web interface 
A business portal, based on Liferay, is integrated into abas ERP using which the database can be accessed via portlets. With the additional product abas eB, applications such as a webshop, a product catalog, the connection of the external sales force and a browser interface for abas ERP can be realized. SOAP services are available to exchange data with other business software.

Print and reporting 
abas is released together with the open source product JasperReports. Direct print of documents is thus possible, but also the generation of reports in various file formats (e.g. PDF, Excel, XML). An open interface makes it possible to integrate additional reporting systems by third-party providers.

HTML help is available for users, administrators and developers and the various Java interfaces are documented in the common Javadoc format.

Mobile  smartphones or tablets have become the standard as mobility plays an even bigger role in living and working environments. Apps for iPad, iPhone, Android and other devices have become more than just a trend, they can be a decisive competitive edge for companies. Users can also have mobile access to their company data, using abas.

There is a customer sponsored user group active on LinkedIn.

Abas was sold to Forterro in 2019.  Forterro is based in Austin, Texas.

See also
 List of ERP vendors
 List of ERP software packages

References 

ERP software companies
Software companies of Germany
Multinational companies headquartered in Germany
Companies based in Baden-Württemberg
Companies established in 1980
German brands